Jagannatha Dasa may refer to:

 Jagannatha Dasa (Odia poet), saint poet, author of the Odia Bhagabata and founder of the Atibadi Sampradaya of Utkaliya Vaishnavism, 15th century, Odisha
 Jagannatha Dasa (Kannada poet), 18th-century Sanskrit scholar from Karnataka